Dorstenia bonijesu is a plant species in the family Moraceae which is native to eastern Brazil.

References

bonijesu
Plants described in 1983
Flora of Brazil